Fortuna Silver Mines Inc. is a Canada-based precious metals mining company with operations in Argentina, Burkina Faso, Mexico and Peru. The Company is primarily engaged in producing silver and gold minerals. The Company’s operated mines and projects include San Jose Mine, Caylloma Mine, Lindero Mine and Yaramoko Mine. It is listed on the Toronto Stock Exchange, and the New York Stock Exchange with a $2.3 million market capitalization as April 2022.

History 
Fortuna was founded in 2004 by Jorge Ganoza and Simon Ridgway.  Ganoza is from a Peruvian mining family.  Fortuna acquired its Caylloma property in 2004, and started production in 2006.  Also in 2006, it acquired the land necessary for its San José del Progreso mine in Mexico.  Construction on the mine began in 2010, with production starting in 2011. 

In 2016, Fortuna acquired Goldrock Mines for C$129 million, for that company's Lindero silver project in Argentina.  In November 2017, the company announced it would move forward with construction at its Lindero project.

Operations 

Fortuna has four operating mines:
 The San Jose Mine is an underground silver-gold mine located in the state of Oaxaca in southern Mexico.
 The Caylloma property is an underground silver, lead and zinc mine located approximately 220 kilometers northwest of the Arequipa Department in southern Peru. Its commercial products are silver-lead and zinc concentrates.
 The Lindero Mine is a gold and copper mine, which is located in the Argentinian puna.
 The Company's Yaramoko Mine consists of approximately two underground gold mines: the 55 Zone and Bagassi South. The Yaramoko Mine project is located in the Hounde greenstone belt region in the Province of Bale in southwestern Burkina Faso.

Controversy 
Fortuna was involved in an ongoing dispute with opponents of its San Jose mine.  In 2009, there was a two-month long blockade at the company's San Jose mine, with protesters worried about industrial contamination.  The blockade lasted from March to May, and was eventually broken up by state police, leading to 19 arrests.  In January 2012, opposition increased, due to concerns that the mine was improperly accessing the local water supply.  In March 2012, Bernardo Vasquez, the leader of an opposition group to the mine, was shot and killed.  One other anti-mine activist was killed in the same year, with three others injured by gunfire.  The company denies responsibility for the violence, saying that it was the result of pre-existing social divisions.

References 

Companies based in Vancouver
Silver mining companies of Canada
Silver mines in Mexico
Companies listed on the Toronto Stock Exchange
Silver mines in Peru